Calapan Cathedral, also known as the Santo Niño Cathedral Parish, is a Roman Catholic cathedral in Calapan, Oriental Mindoro, Philippines, dedicated to the Santo Niño. It is the episcopal seat of the Apostolic Vicariate of Calapan and is a marked historical structure by the Philippine National Commission for Culture and the Arts.

History
The church and parish mission of Calapan was founded in 1679 by Fr. Diego de la Madre de Dios, an Augustinian Recollect. Under Fr. de la Madre de Dios, the church was fortified with stone walls. Due to frequent Moro raids in the island, two watchtowers and twenty cannons were also installed in the church and its environs. In another Moro raid on October 23, 1754, Fr. Andres de Jesus y Maria, then the parish priest of Calapan, and many people taking refuge in the church, were taken as hostages and were brought to Mindanao. In August 1881, the church was burned, and was reconstructed in 1887. Revolutionists in 1898 prior to the Philippine-American War occupied the church. In 1936, the Apostolic Prefecture of Mindoro, then comprising the present-day provinces of Oriental Mindoro, Occidental Mindoro and Romblon, was carved from the territories of the dioceses of Jaro and Lipa. Towards the end of the World War II in 1945, the church this time was occupied by the Americans and was turned over to the Filipinos in the same year. In 1951, the apostolic prefecture was elevated to Apostolic Vicariate of Calapan. In 1962, the present cathedral was finished. The Calapan vicariate subsequently lost territories to establish the Diocese of Romblon in 1974 and the Apostolic Vicariate of San Jose in Mindoro in 1983.

Gallery

References

External links
 Facebook page  

Roman Catholic churches in Oriental Mindoro
Marked Historical Structures of the Philippines
Spanish Colonial architecture in the Philippines
Roman Catholic cathedrals in the Philippines
17th-century Roman Catholic church buildings in the Philippines
18th-century Roman Catholic church buildings in the Philippines
19th-century Roman Catholic church buildings in the Philippines
20th-century Roman Catholic church buildings in the Philippines